Mary Beaton (1543–1598) was a Scottish noblewoman and an attendant of Mary, Queen of Scots. She and three other ladies-in-waiting (Mary Livingston, Mary Fleming and Mary Seton) were collectively known as "The Four Marys".

Family 

Mary was born in 1543, the third of five children of Robert Beaton, 4th Laird of Creich, and Joanna or Jane Renwall. Mary's mother was one of Marie de Guise's ladies-in-waiting; she died in June 1577 at Dunbog in Fife. Mary's aunt, Janet Beaton, was a mistress of James Hepburn, Earl of Bothwell, who would in 1567 become the third husband of Queen Mary.

At court in France and Scotland 
In 1548, at the age of five, Mary Beaton was chosen by Marie de Guise to accompany her daughter Mary, Queen of Scots, to France. She, along with three other girls who also accompanied the Queen, became known as the "Four Marys."

On 26 May 1562 the four women attended Mary at the ceremony of the opening of the Parliament of Scotland. Thomas Randolph described the procession of "four virgins, maydes, Maries, damoyselles of honor, or the Queen's mignions, cawle [call] them as please your honor, but a fayerrer [fairer] syghte was never seen".

In June 1563 Mary Beaton wrote to Anne Carew, Lady Throckmorton, the wife of the English diplomat Nicholas Throckmorton, thanking her for the present of a ring brought to her in Edinburgh by Captain Tremayn. Mary sent her ring to Lady Throckmorton in return. She signed this letter "Marie de Bethune".

Black velvet gowns were made for Mary Beaton and Lady Livingstone in February 1564 by the Queen's tailor Jehan de Compiegne.

Marriage 
Mary, described as having been pretty and plump, with fair hair and dark eyes, attracted the attentions of an older man, Thomas Randolph. At the time of the courtship, in 1564, Randolph was 45 and Mary was 21. Randolph was Queen Elizabeth's ambassador to the Scottish court, and wanted Mary Beaton to spy on her mistress for him, which she refused to do.

In April 1565 Mary Beaton and Randolph teamed up to play bowls with the queen and Lord Darnley at Stirling Castle. They won, and Darnley gave Beaton a ring and a brooch with two agates worth fifty crowns. One of Randolph's Scottish contacts, Alexander Clark sent him a letter teasing him about their relationship in a joke using nonsense words; "And as to your mistress Marie Beton, she is both darimpus and sclenbrunit, and you in like manner without contrebaxion or kylteperante, so you are both worth little money."

George Buchanan wrote Latin verses praising her in his Valentiniana.

Mary Beaton eventually married Alexander Ogilvy of Boyne in April 1566. They had one son, James, born in 1568.

In June 1566 she was with Mary, Queen of Scots, in Edinburgh Castle when she gave birth to Prince James, later James VI. Beaton told Sir James Melville of Halhill, who rode to London with the news.

After the execution of Queen Mary, it was claimed by the writer Adam Blackwood in 1587 that Mary Beaton's handwriting was similar to the Queen's and so some of her private letters might have formed the basis for the casket letters produced to incriminate Queen Mary.

In May 1590 she greeted the new queen of Scotland, Anne of Denmark, at the Shore of Leith, with the Countess of Mar, Lady Seton, Lady Thirlestane, and Lady Dudhope and 30 other gentlewomen.

Mary, Queen of Scots, made a will leaving her books to Beaton, who had literary interests, but she probably never received the queen's library. She gave a copy of the Comedies of Terence in Latin and French to James VI. Later, she became a friend of the poet William Fowler, who served as secretary to Anna of Denmark. He dedicated a translation from Ariosto to "The right honourable Ladye Marye betoun Ladye Boine." She wrote a poem to preface his translation of the Triumphs of Petrarch.

She died in 1598 at the age of 55.

In popular culture
In the 2013-17 CW television series Reign, the character, Lady Greer, played by Celina Sinden is loosely based on Mary Beaton.

In the 2018 film Mary, Queen of Scots, Mary Beaton is played by Northern Irish actress Eileen O’Higgins.

Resources 
St Andrews: Noble order of Royal Scots
 Antonia Fraser, Mary, Queen of Scots, Dell Publishing Co., Inc. New York, March 1971

References

1543 births
1598 deaths
Court of Mary, Queen of Scots
16th-century Scottish women
Scottish ladies-in-waiting
People from Fife
16th-century Scottish people
16th-century Scottish poets
Scottish women poets